is a Japanese football player. He plays for ReinMeer Aomori.

Career
Genki Ishisaka joined J3 League club Kataller Toyama in 2016. On June 3, 2017, he debuted in J3 League (v SC Sagamihara). In August, he moved to Japan Football League club Briobecca Urayasu.

Club statistics
Updated to 20 February 2017.

References

External links

Profile at Briobecca Urayasu 

1993 births
Living people
Toyo University alumni
Association football people from Toyama Prefecture
Japanese footballers
J3 League players
Japan Football League players
Kataller Toyama players
Briobecca Urayasu players
ReinMeer Aomori players
Association football defenders